Paul-Henri Mathieu defeated Albert Montañés 6–1, 6–1, to win the 2007 Grand Prix Hassan II singles event.

Seeds

Draws

Key
Q - Qualifier
WC - Wildcard
r - Retired

Finals

Top half

Bottom half

External links
Association of Tennis Professionals (ATP) draw
Association of Tennis Professionals (ATP) Qualifying draw

Singles